The 1920–21 season was Port Vale's second consecutive season of football (15th overall) in the English Football League. The season peaked early with a double victory in the league over rivals Stoke, however any sense of euphoria evaporated in February with the sale of star striker Bobby Blood. The club failed to find another reliable goalscorer until the arrival of Wilf Kirkham in 1923. The Vale finished at the bottom end of the table, though they did finish higher in the league than Stoke for the first time in their history.

Overview

Second Division
During the pre-season, manager-secretary Joe Schofield stated that: "the future policy of Port Vale is to go ahead". He duly signed experienced full-back Bob Pursell, brother of Peter, from Liverpool. The capacity of The Old Recreation Ground was increased to 30,000; mainly due to the fund raising activities of the Supporters' Club. Of the 1919–20 squad, only William Aitken was let go, for a fee of £2,500 to Newcastle United. That money helped to pay for £400 Tom Page from St Mirren, and right-half Freddy Price from Wolverhampton Wanderers.

The season started positively enough; a 2–0 win over new club Leeds United helped to establish a start of six points from the opening six games. On 25 September, the "Valiants" delighted their fans by recording their first league victory over rivals Stoke in 'a stirring duel' which ended 2–1. The following week they achieved the double over Stoke by recording a 1–0 victory at the Victoria Ground. This encouraged fans to travel in their numbers to see the team beat Nottingham Forest 4–1 at the City Ground. Injuries to Price and Brough then saw the team slump, and this continued when new signing, Manchester City goalkeeper Walter Smith was arrested for assault on the day of his debut. The arrest is likely to account for a majority of the six goals he conceded that day at South Shields. The side recovered to record heavy victories over Hull City and Stockport County, with Bobby Blood scoring six of the Vale's ten goals in the two games. Vale lost both their games to Bristol City, though Blood demonstrated his fearsome shooting power by blasting a penalty kick at City's keeper – the keeper saved the penalty to keep a clean sheet but broke his wrist in the process of saving the shot. Blood was sold to West Bromwich Albion for £4,000 in February – then a club record for both clubs. The effect on the pitch was telling, as Vale went on to record just two wins in their remaining sixteen games, with a meagre six goals scored. One of the victories was a 'flash in the pan' win over FA Cup semi-finalists Cardiff City, Cardiff fielded a weakened team and watched in bewilderment as Page scored the winning goal from the penalty spot, stubbing his foot in the process.

At the end of the season, Vale finished six points ahead of relegated Stockport County, but 22 points behind the promotion places. Only a handful of teams had lost fewer away matches than Vale, however Vale boasted fewer home wins than any other club in the league, and even with Blood in the side the club struggled to find goals.

A core of six players formed the spine of the team: Peter and Bob Pursell, with Tom Lyons in defence; Joe Brough at half-back; with Billy Briscoe and Tom Page in forward positions. Page contributed to the goals tally, but Blood was the sole hope in front of goal, racking up 20 goals in 25 league games before his transfer. In the addition to the Pursell brothers, Harry and John Johnstone also made sporadic appearances; in one match both the Pursell brothers and the Johnstone brothers took to the field.

Finances
The issue of finance reared its head in September with an appeal for greater support from chairman Frank Huntbach. The chairman emphasised the club's potential and pleaded for the remaining £4,500 worth of shares to be snapped up. The Pursell brothers were so affected by the speech that they each bought £5 worth of shares. The club later received a £70 boost when supporters bought copies of "The Port Vale War-Cry", though more significant was the elevated noise level as supporters sang the cry throughout matches. Vale's weather-conscious supporters would turn up in their number during sunshine, but were somewhat unreliable during the winter. The club were desperate to increase ground capacity but were already facing worrying financial times, despite the club debt falling to £800. Though the sale of Blood raised considerable funds, fans were outraged, especially as Schofield and the directors refused to comment on the issue – Blood was apparently told by the club that either "[he] went or the club". At the end of the season a £1,187 profit was recorded.

Cup competitions
The club failed to qualify for the FA Cup, losing their qualification match with league rivals Clapton Orient. The North Staffordshire Infirmary Cup went to Stoke, who claimed victory with a 5–3 win at The Old Recreation Ground.

League table

Results
Port Vale's score comes first

Football League Second Division

Results by matchday

Matches

FA Cup

North Staffordshire Infirmary Cup

Player statistics

Appearances

Top scorers

Transfers

Transfers in

Transfers out

References
Specific

General

Port Vale F.C. seasons
Port Vale